Hisscivilization is the third studio album by the Brazilian musician Jupiter Apple. It was released in 2002 by Voiceprint Records, and is the musician's most experimental, ambitious and elaborate output. Heavily influenced by the sonority of Syd Barrett, Stereolab and of the Canterbury scene (in particular Kevin Ayers and his 1970 release Shooting at the Moon), Hisscivilization is characterized by the inclusion of electronic interludes, absent in Jupiter Apple's previous two releases, in a move that polarized critics and fans alike. It is also fully sung in English, like its predecessor Plastic Soda.

"Exactly" was re-recorded for his subsequent collaborative album with Bibmo, Bitter.

Critical reception
The album was well-received upon its release, but many critics did not gravitate towards its heavily experimental sonority and long length. Writing for AllMusic, François Couture gave it 3 out of 5 stars, saying it is "filled with catchy hooks, intriguing twists and self-indulgent stretches", and comparing Jupiter Apple with Cornelius and Beck. However, he also said that "the album's only flaw is its duration – problem is, it's a big one. Not only does Hisscivilization clock in at 78 minutes, but most of its 13 tracks could have been substantially shortened". Matheus Donay of O Notório Abacaxi praised the album for its "Futuristic and Surrealist artfulness", but also criticized it for its length and stated that it requires "lots of patience" to listen to.

Track listing

Personnel
 Jupiter Apple – vocals, electric guitar, classical guitar, percussion, Moog, production, mixing
 Thomas Dreher – production, mixing, mastering
 Fernando Sanches – engineering

References

2002 albums
Voiceprint Records albums